GetRight is a shareware download manager developed by Michael Burford. Burford's company, Headlight Software, first published the program in 1997. At the time of its release, one of GetRight's defining features was its ability to resume an interrupted download.

Download manager
GetRight is able to pause and resume downloads, download from multiple servers to speed up download time (segmented file transfer), scheduling the starting and stopping of downloads and shutting off the computer or disconnecting the modem when the downloads have finished. It is also able to integrate with Microsoft's Internet Explorer, and Mozilla Firefox with the FlashGot extension. It features support for the BitTorrent protocol, Metalink, and podcast support, along with built-in verification MD5 and SHA-1 checksums. In its time it was  a well known download manager.

License modes
Version 6 is available in two license modes: Standard and Pro. "Standard" is the continuation of previous versions, while "Pro" contains new features like: upload capability, using scripts for programming its tasks, a simple web server (called "Web Access"), ability to act as a proxy server or work in a Client/Server mode when using two or more computers in a network.

References

External links
GetRight Official Website
HitPaw Video Enhancer

1997 software
Download managers
BitTorrent clients
Windows-only shareware